Jan Lewandowski (born 15 August 1941 in Bydgoszcz, Poland) known professionally as Jan Lewan, is a Polish-American songwriter and polka band leader. Lewan's financial crimes were described by The Morning Call as a "classic Ponzi scheme".

Lewan's life has been depicted in multiple films, first in the 2007 TV documentary Mystery of the Polka King, the 2009 documentary film The Man Who Would Be Polka King, and the 2017 American comedy film The Polka King, in which Lewandowski is portrayed by Jack Black, which was released on Netflix on January 12, 2018.

Early life 
Information on Lewan's early life is found primarily on his official website, which states that Lewan was born in Bydgoszcz in northern Poland in 1941 during the German occupation of the country during World War II. As a young child Lewan loved music and enrolled in Conservatory of Music in Gdańsk. He also sang in an opera. Lewan served in the Central Polish Army for several years as all young men in Poland were obliged to do at the time. Lewan played in music halls across Poland and Northern Europe including the National Philharmonic in Warsaw. When Lewan came to the United States he  later met his first wife Rhonda Lewan during a telethon and wed later on, and in 2011 officially divorced. Rhonda then married Steve Saive, the former trumpet player of Jan Lewan's polka band.

Career 
After his career in Europe, Lewan moved to the United States via Canada in 1972. He settled in Northeastern Pennsylvania, where he continued his polka career. He was a main part in the foundation of Pennsylvania Polka on PCN. During this time Lewan toured frequently. Notable tours were to Poland, Ireland, Italy, Germany, France, Belgium, England, Israel, Russia, Greece, Egypt, and Ukraine.

He created a polka-oriented orchestra and recorded several albums. Lewan's self-titled album, Jan Lewan and His Orchestra, was nominated for a Grammy in 1995. Lewan went on to perform even bigger polka shows in the prestigious Las Vegas Hilton Showroom, Las Vegas Sands Convention Center, and Atlantic City's Trump Plaza Hotel and Casino, Atlantis Hotel and Casino, and Trump Castle Hotel Casino.

Lewan's legacy was the focal point of the 2007 TV documentary Mystery of Polka King, its 2009 documentary film follow-up, The Man Who Would Be Polka King, as well as the 2017 comedy film The Polka King in which Lewan is portrayed by Jack Black.

Legal issues 
Lewan owned and operated a gift store in Hazleton, Pennsylvania. When he would tour back in Poland, he would bring back jewelry and other goods to sell in the store. To support the store, he also sold shares in the business and promised returns of 12 and 20 percent to investors, many of whom had traveled with him. The state of Pennsylvania warned him to stop selling securities, but Lewan continued. In 2004 Lewan was arrested for defrauding some 400 people in 22 states of millions of dollars. Lewan was sentenced to five years and 11 months imprisonment by a federal court judge as well as a seven-year sentence in New Jersey, which were served concurrently.  Lewan was prosecuted by the New Jersey Division of Criminal Justice and was sentenced by the Mercer County Superior Court on Money Laundering and Securities Fraud charges.

While in prison in Delaware in 2004, Lewan was stabbed in the neck by a cellmate. He was taken to a nearby hospital and was sent back to prison several days later. The perpetrator of the stabbing had 15 years added to his sentence. Lewan was released from prison in 2009.

Awards and honors

List of  awards nominations

Vehicle accident 
On January 26, 2001, Lewan's tour bus crashed en route to Florida for six shows. Two of his musicians were killed, he was injured and his son Daniel suffered critical injuries.

References

External links 
 Official website
 IMDb

1941 births
Living people
Musicians from Bydgoszcz
Polish emigrants to the United States
Finance fraud
Polka musicians
Pyramid and Ponzi schemes
Criminals from Pennsylvania